The following highways are numbered 763:

Canada
 Saskatchewan Highway 763

United States